Sunnyside High School, is located in Sunnyside, Washington, United States. It is a high school that serves 1,877 (May 2016) students from grades 9–12. Their athletic team name is the Grizzlies. Sunnyside High School has won several awards for academic excellence in recent years.

Demographics
For the 2015–16 school year, 91.2% of the student body is Hispanic, while 7.8% are white. The rest (1%) is Black/ African American or Two or More Races.

Graduation rate and awards
In 2008, the graduation rate of Sunnyside High School was 49.8%. This led to the school being awarded a School Improvement Grant. The efforts of school staff, students, and parents led to a dramatic increase in the graduation rate. In 2015 the graduation rate was 89.2%.

Sunnyside High School was named a School of Distinction in 2015 and 2016. According to ESD105, "The Schools of Distinction Award goes to the top 5 percent of Washington schools that have attained the most outstanding levels of sustained improvement in English language arts, math, and graduation rates among their students over the past five years."

Sunnyside High School Principal Ryan Maxwell was named the 2016 Washington State High School Principal of the Year by the Association of Washington School Principals.

Notable alumni

 Clint Ritchie, Actor
 Ed Barker, former NFL player
 Bonnie Dunbar, NASA astronaut
 Jake Kupp, former NFL player
 Scott Linehan, former NFL head coach
 Irving Newhouse, Washington State Representative and Senator
 Joel Guzman, Grammy award winning musician and producer

References

External links
 
Sunnyside School District
Washington State OSPI Report Card 2015-16

Public high schools in Washington (state)
High schools in Yakima County, Washington
Sunnyside, Washington